This is a list of professional golf tournaments in the United States by city.

It does not include touring events such as the U.S. Open, PGA Championship and Ryder Cup.

See also 
 List of American and Canadian cities by number of major professional sports franchises
 List of auto racing tracks in the United States by city
 List of top level minor league sports teams in the United States by city
 List of soccer clubs in the United States by city

 City
Golf